"She Keeps the Home Fires Burning" is a song written by Mike Reid, Don Pfrimmer and Dennis Morgan, and recorded by American country music singer Ronnie Milsap.  It was released in April 1985 as the first single from his Greatest Hits, Vol. 2 compilation album.

The song was Milsap's  41st single to be released, and his 26th No. 1 hit on the country charts, the song is highly regarded as one of Milsap's most popular songs. The song is also featured on numerous compilation albums; including 40 #1 Hits and The Essential Ronnie Milsap.

Charts

Weekly charts

Year-end charts

References

1985 singles
1985 songs
Ronnie Milsap songs
Songs written by Dennis Morgan (songwriter)
Songs written by Don Pfrimmer
Songs written by Mike Reid (singer)
Song recordings produced by Tom Collins (record producer)
RCA Records singles